The 59049/59050 Valsad - Viramgam Passenger is a passenger train of the Indian Railways connecting  in Gujarat and  of Gujarat. It is currently being operated with 59049/59050 train numbers on a daily basis.

Coach Composition

The train consists of 18 coaches:

 15 General Unreserved(GEN)
 2 Seating cum Luggage Rake(SLR)
 1 First-class Coach(FC)

Service

The 59049/Valsad - Viramgam Passenger has average speed of 26 km/hr and covers 363 km in 14 hrs 15 mins.

The 59050/Viramgam - Valsad Passenger has average speed of 28 km/hr and covers 363 km in 12 hrs 55 mins. It has punctuality ratio around 50-60%.

Route & Halts 

Traction

External links 

 59049/Valsad - Viramgam Passenger
 59050/Viramgam - Valsad Passenger

References 

Transport in Valsad
Rail transport in Gujarat